Be Here album by Keith Urban 2004

Be Here, album by Rachel Platten 2011
"Be Here", song by Raphael Saadiq from Instant Vintage 2002